The Revelation appears in William "Cocktail" Boothby's 1908 work, The World's Drinks And How To Mix Them as "A swell after-dinner drink."  

Into a small mixing-glass place a little cracked ice, two-thirds of a pony of Bénédictine, one-third of a pony of Kümmel and seven drops (no more) of Crème de menthe. Twist and throw in a piece of lemon peel (a la cocktail). Stir thoroughly until cold and serve in a pony-glass.

This is a most seductive after-dinner beverage, and it was originated by Mr. Dennis O'Sullivan, the well-known mixologist, several years ago, and is still very popular with many connoisseurs and clubmen."

References

Cocktails with liqueur